Mount Sampson is a  mountain summit located in the Thiassi Range of the Coast Mountains, in the Pemberton Valley of southwestern British Columbia, Canada. It is the highest point in the Thiassi Range. Precipitation runoff from the peak drains into tributaries of the Lillooet and Hurley Rivers.

The mountain was named in association with Sampson Creek, which flows south from the mountain. In 1911, E.N. Sampson acquired a preemption located on the east side of the locally named Sampson Creek. It was spelled Samson Mountain when it was first adopted in 1967 on maps. The spelling was officially corrected and adopted April 29, 1983, by the Geographical Names Board of Canada to conform with the creek. The first ascent of the mountain was made in 1935 by Preston Tait, John Ronayne, and Ronald Ronayne.

Climate

Based on the Köppen climate classification, Mount Sampson is located in a subarctic climate zone of western North America. Most weather fronts originate in the Pacific Ocean, and travel east toward the Coast Mountains where they are forced upward by the range (Orographic lift), causing them to drop their moisture in the form of rain or snowfall. As a result, the Coast Mountains experience high precipitation, especially during the winter months in the form of snowfall. Temperatures can drop below −20 °C with wind chill factors below −30 °C. The mountain and its climate supports an unnamed glacier on its northern slope. The months July through September offer the most favorable weather for climbing Sampson.

See also

 Geography of British Columbia
 Geology of British Columbia

References

External links
 Weather: Mount Sampson 
 Mt. Sampson photo: Flickr

Two-thousanders of British Columbia
Pacific Ranges
Lillooet Land District